Ozark Iron Furnace Stack, also known as the Ozark Iron Works, is a historic iron furnace located near Newburg, Phelps County, Missouri. It was built in 1873, and is a pyramidal shaped furnace stack constructed of hard, compact, fine-drained sandstone blocks on a solid rock foundation. It measures approximately 40 feet in height.  The furnace was in operation until 1884. The furnace is located mostly on private property and may not be visible from public right-of-way.

It was listed on the National Register of Historic Places in 1970.

References

Ironworks and steel mills in the United States
Industrial buildings and structures on the National Register of Historic Places in Missouri
Industrial buildings completed in 1873
Buildings and structures in Phelps County, Missouri
National Register of Historic Places in Phelps County, Missouri
Industrial furnaces
1873 establishments in Missouri